Seychellea may refer to:

 Seychellea (animal), a genus of bony fish in the family Gobiidae
 Seychellea (plant), a genus of flowering plant in the family Rubiaceae